Neoschizomers are restriction enzymes that recognize the same nucleotide sequence as their prototype but cleave at a different site. In some special applications this is a very helpful feature. 

For example:Prototype MaeII	A^CGT	produces DNA fragments with a 2-base 5' extension
Neoschizomer TaiI	ACGT^	produces DNA fragments with a 4-base 3' extension
 		
Prototype ApaI	GGGCC^C	produces DNA fragments with a 4-base 3' extension
Neoschizomer Bsp120I	G^GGCCC	produces DNA fragments with a 4-base 5' extension

There are also other pairs of neoschizomers.

Neoschizomers are a subset of isoschizomers.

References

 Rebase restriction enzyme database, http://rebase.neb.com/rebase/

See also

Restriction enzymes

pl:Izoschizomery